Jonas Gabriel da Silva Nunes (born 30 May 1999), known as Jonas Toró or simply Toró, is a Brazilian professional footballer who plays as a winger for Greek Super League club Levadiakos, on loan from Panathinaikos.

Career statistics

Club

References

1999 births
Living people
Brazilian footballers
Brazil youth international footballers
Association football forwards
Campeonato Brasileiro Série A players
São Paulo FC players
Sport Club do Recife players
Atlético Clube Goianiense players
Brazilian expatriate footballers
Expatriate footballers in Greece
Brazilian expatriate sportspeople in Greece
Super League Greece players
Panathinaikos F.C. players
Levadiakos F.C. players